Peter Sampil (born 22 November 1974) is a French former professional footballer who played as a striker. In his career, he made over 300 appearances and scored over 80 goals in the second, third, and fourth tiers of French football.

Post-playing career 
Sampil retired from football in 2009. From 2015 to 2017, he was the head coach of the reserve side of SC Beaucouzé. From 2017 to 2019, he was a member of the first team’s managerial staff.

Honours 
Beauvais

 Championnat National: 1999–2000

Amiens

 Coupe de France runner-up: 2000–01

References 

1971 births
Living people
People from Rambouillet
Footballers from Yvelines
French footballers
Black French sportspeople
Association football forwards
Racing Club de France Football players
Paris Saint-Germain F.C. players
FC Rouen players
Pacy Ménilles RC players
FC Istres players
AS Beauvais Oise players
Amiens SC players
Angers SCO players
FC Dieppe players
SO Romorantin players
Championnat National 2 players
Championnat National
Ligue 2 players
French football managers
Association football coaches